During World War I, both Britain and France sent military forces to Italy in October 1917.

Following the Battle of Caporetto (24 October to 19 November 1917), the Italian Front collapsed. In order to ensure this did not lead to Italy withdrawing from the war the allies organised forces to reinforce the Italians. As the battle unfolded, General Luigi Cadorna invoked the agreement reached at the Chantilly Conference of December 1915. There the allies had agreed that should any of the allies come under threat, the other allies would support them. The first French troops arrived on 27 October 1917. The first British troops followed them after a few days. Fearing that his troops would be overrun and lost in case the Italian lines on the Piave river would be broken by the Austro-Hungarian and German forces, however, General Foch refused to commit them to the frontline until the Italian troops had halted the Central Powers' troops by themselves and firmly established a defensive line on the Piave river. The British was thus kept in reserve during the First Battle of the Piave (November 1917) and only saw action from December 1917 onwards.

The French expeditionary force (:fr:Forces françaises en Italie) consisted primarily of the French Tenth Army with the addition of the 12th Army Corps and 31st Army Corps. They took up station around Verona. Four of the six French divisions (46e, 47e, 64e, 65e) were to return to the Western Front in spring 1918, with the two divisions of 12th Corps remaining in Italy.

The British Expeditionary Force (Italy) came under the command of General Herbert Plumer. The principal units in the BEF(I) were the 23rd, 41st, 7th, 48th and 5th divisions. The 5th Division returned to France on 1 March 1918, followed by the 41st Division in April. Lieutenant General Cavan was appointed Commander-in-Chief of British Forces in  Italy on 10 March 1918, comprising the three divisions of XIV Corps (United Kingdom).

Notes

References

Further reading
 
 
 
 

Italian front (World War I)
1917 in Italy
Expeditionary units and formations